The Marianna Waterworks are located at 252 United States Route 79 in Marianna, Arkansas.  The facilities at this location include an office building, two clear wells, one wellhouse, an aeration chamber, a water wheel, and a c. 1980 brick outbuilding and steel watertower.  The main office building was built in 1936–37 with funding from the Public Works Administration, a Depression-era jobs program, while many of the other facilities were built c. 1930.  The office building is a rambling T-shaped structure, with sections that are either one or two stories in height.  It is built of red brick in the then-popular Spanish Revival style.

The facility was listed on the National Register of Historic Places in 2007.

See also
National Register of Historic Places listings in Lee County, Arkansas

References

Water supply infrastructure on the National Register of Historic Places
Industrial buildings and structures on the National Register of Historic Places in Arkansas
Neoclassical architecture in Arkansas
Buildings and structures completed in 1930
Buildings and structures in Lee County, Arkansas
Former pumping stations
National Register of Historic Places in Lee County, Arkansas